Anne Stava-Murray is a Democratic member of the Illinois House of Representatives for the 81st district. She took office on January 9, 2019. The 81st district, located in DuPage and Will counties, includes all or portions of Downers Grove, Lisle, Naperville, Woodridge, Darien, Westmont, and Bolingbrook.

Stava-Murray narrowly defeated Republican incumbent David Olsen despite spending only $30,000 during the entire 2018 election cycle.

Stava-Murray, a Naperville resident, served on the community’s Board of Fire and Police. She is a graduate of Dartmouth College.

Stava-Murray originally announced a run for the United States Senate in 2020 on January 1, 2019, but she would later call off the bid in March according to the Daily Herald, "largely because she found out she had been mistaken in her belief that [Dick] Durbin was not going to seek re-election," and chose to seek a second term as state representative.

As of July 3, 2022, Representative Stava-Murray is a member of the following Illinois House committees:

 Appropriations - Elementary & Secondary Education Committee (HAPE)
 Appropriations - Human Services Committee (HAPH)
 Citizen Impact Subcommittee (HMAC-CITI)
 Housing Committee (SHOU)
 Immigration & Human Rights Committee (SIHR)
 Judiciary - Criminal Committee (HJUC)
 Museums, Arts, & Cultural Enhancement Committee (HMAC)

Electoral history

References

External links
 Team Stava-Murray official campaign website

21st-century American politicians
21st-century American women politicians
Dartmouth College alumni
Democratic Party members of the Illinois House of Representatives
Politicians from Naperville, Illinois
Women state legislators in Illinois
Year of birth missing (living people)
Living people
Candidates in the 2020 United States elections